USS Crowninshield (DD–134) was a  in the United States Navy between World War I and World War II. She was named for Benjamin Williams Crowninshield. In World War II she was transferred to the Royal Navy where she was named HMS Chelsea, and subsequently to the Soviet Navy where she was named Derzky.

Construction and career

United States Navy 
Crowninshield was launched 24 July 1919 by Bath Iron Works, Bath, Maine; sponsored by Emily Crowninshield Davis, great-great-granddaughter of B. W. Crowninshield. The ship was commissioned on 6 August 1919 and reported to the Atlantic Fleet.

Crowninshield cruised along the Atlantic coast and in the Caribbean, participating in 1921 in the fleet concentration in the Panama Canal Zone and Cuban waters. During this exercise she carried Secretary of the Navy Josephus Daniels from Key West to Guantanamo Bay for fleet maneuvers. From 14 November 1921 Crowninshield operated with 50 percent of her complement until placed out of commission in reserve at Philadelphia, Pennsylvania 7 July 1922.

Recommissioned 12 May 1930, Crowninshield arrived at San Diego, California 4 April 1931 to join the Battle Force. She took part in fleet problems and exercises on the west coast, in Hawaiian and Caribbean waters; operated with Aircraft, Battle Force; conducted practice cruises to Canadian and Alaskan ports for members of the Naval Reserve; and spent from 15 July to 17 December 1934 in the Rotating Reserve. She was at San Diego between 30 October and 2 November 1935, for the Presidential Fleet Review and attended the ceremonies opening the San Francisco–Oakland Bay Bridge in November 1936. Crowninshield was decommissioned at San Diego on 8 April 1937.

Recommissioned on 30 September 1939, Crowninshield sailed from Mare Island 25 November and arrived at Guantanamo Bay, Cuba on 10 December for duty with the Neutrality Patrol in the Caribbean and Gulf of Mexico. On 9 September 1940 she was decommissioned at Halifax (former city), Nova Scotia, and was delivered to British authorities in the land bases for destroyers exchange. She was commissioned in the Royal Navy as HMS Chelsea the same day.

Royal Navy and Royal Canadian Navy

Chelsea reached Devonport, England, 28 September 1940. Assigned to the Sixth Escort Group, Western Approaches Command, Liverpool, for Atlantic convoy duty, she fought the double-menace submarine and air attacks on vital supplies. On 6 April 1941 she rescued 29 survivors of SS Olga S. which had been sunk by an air attack.  Chelsea was modified for trade convoy escort service by removal of three of the original 4"/50 caliber guns and one of the triple torpedo tube mounts to reduce topside weight for additional depth charge stowage and installation of hedgehog.

Chelsea joined  on 5 February 1942 to hunt for a submarine sighted from their convoy. Two hours later Arbutus was torpedoed. Chelsea opened fire on the surfaced submarine and made three depth charge attacks after she dived but contact was lost and she returned to pick up the survivors from Arbutus.

In November 1942 Chelsea was lent to the Royal Canadian Navy and until the end of 1943 operated in the mid and western Atlantic Ocean escorting convoys to and from Great Britain. She returned to Derry, Northern Ireland, 26 December 1943 and early in 1944 was reduced to reserve on the Tyne. On 16 July 1944 she was transferred to Russia and renamed Derzky (rus. Дерзкий, "Insolent").

Soviet Navy 

Derzky was one of eight s transferred to the Soviet Navy in lieu of Italian vessels surrendered in September 1943 and claimed by the Soviet Union as war reparations in May 1944. She sailed for Murmansk and was commissioned into the Northern Fleet. There she served as local convoy escort for the remainder of hostilities.

In 1949 she was transferred back to the Royal Navy, but was scrapped without re-commissioning.

References

Notes

Citations

Sources 
 Gardiner R, Chesnau R (1980) Conway's All the World's Fighting Ships 1922–1946

External links

 NavSource Photos
 SovietNavy-WW2: Таун ("Town") class
 U-boat.net: Derzkij

 

Wickes-class destroyers
Ships built in Bath, Maine
1919 ships
Town-class destroyers of the Royal Navy
Town-class destroyers converted from Wickes-class destroyers
World War II destroyers of the United Kingdom
Town-class destroyers of the Soviet Navy
World War II destroyers of the Soviet Union
USS Crowninshield (DD-134)